TRNA (guanine10-N2)-methyltransferase ((m2G10) methyltransferase, Trm11-Trm112 complex) is an enzyme with systematic name S-adenosyl-L-methionine:tRNA (guanine10-N2)-methyltransferase. This enzyme catalyses the following chemical reaction

 S-adenosyl-L-methionine + guanine10 in tRNA  S-adenosyl-L-homocysteine + N2-methylguanine10 in tRNA

tRNA (guanine10-N2)-methyltransferase from yeast does not catalyse the methylation from N2-methylguanine10 to N2-dimethylguanine10 in tRNA.

References

External links 
 

EC 2.1.1